William Blades (September 27, 1798March 14, 1877) was a Michigan politician and preacher.

Early life
Blades was born in Worcester County, Maryland, on September 27, 1798. Blades learned hattery. In 1828, Blades moved away Maryland because of his aversion to slavery. Blades first moved to Newark, New Jersey, then East Avon, New York, until finally moving to Genesee County, Michigan, in 1835. He lived in Grand Blanc until around 1845, where he then moved to Flint.

Career
From around 1852 until his death, Blades served as an active Methodist Episcopal preacher, and was said to have "married and buried" more people than anyone else in the county. Blades served as justice of the peace from 1835 to 1845. Blades served as Genesee County sheriff from 1844 to 1846. On November 1, 1847, Blades was elected to the Michigan House of Representatives where he represented the Genesee County district from January 3, 1848, to April 3, 1848. During his time in the legislature, Blades was a member of the Whig Party. Later, he was a Republican. In his later years, Blades served as a superintendent of the poor.

Personal life
Williams Blades had a son named Francis Asbury Blades, who also served as a preacher.

Death
Blades died on March 14, 1877, in Flint.

References

1798 births
1877 deaths
American justices of the peace
Michigan sheriffs
Members of the Methodist Episcopal Church
People from Worcester County, Maryland
Politicians from Flint, Michigan
Members of the Michigan House of Representatives
Michigan Whigs
Michigan Republicans
19th-century American politicians
19th-century American judges
19th-century Methodists